Asnan (also Romanized as Asnān and Esnān; also known as Īsnu) is a village in Shakhenat Rural District, in the Central District of Birjand County, South Khorasan Province, Iran. At the 2006 census, its population was 298, in 87 families.

References 

Populated places in Birjand County